Events from the year 1741 in Great Britain.

Incumbents
 Monarch – George II
 Prime Minister – Robert Walpole (Whig)
 Parliament – 8th (until 27 April), 9th (starting 25 June)

Events
 13 February – Robert Walpole, the Prime Minister, introduces the term "balance of power" in a speech in Parliament.
 14 February – Irish-born actor Charles Macklin makes his London stage debut as Shylock in The Merchant of Venice at the Theatre Royal, Drury Lane, pioneering a psychologically realistic style with Shakespeare's text revived, replacing George Granville's melodramatic adaptation The Jew of Venice.
 March – Lancelot "Capability" Brown joins Lord Cobham's gardening staff at Stowe, Buckinghamshire.
 13 March – The Royal Navy brings 180 warships, frigates and transport vessels, led by Admiral Edward Vernon, to threaten Cartagena, Colombia, with more than 27,000 crew against the 3,600 defenders.
 13 April – The Royal Military Academy, Woolwich, is established to train officers of the Royal Artillery and Royal Engineers.
 9 May – War of Jenkins' Ear: Battle of Cartagena de Indias – Spain's defenders in New Grenada, under the command of General Blas de Lezo, defeat Vernon's Royal Navy force, leading to a British retreat to Jamaica.
 14 May – HMS Wager, one of the vessels of George Anson's voyage around the world is wrecked on the coast of Chile, killing most of the surviving crew.
 21 May – George II orders the British Army to prepare for an invasion of Prussia to defend his Electorate of Hanover.
 11 June – 1741 British general election, begun on 30 April, concludes with Prime Minister Robert Walpole's Whigs retaining their majority in the House of Commons but losing control of a number of rotten and pocket boroughs with 44 seats lost to candidates who have defected to the new Patriot Whigs to oppose Walpole's policies.
 18 July – War of Jenkins' Ear: Invasion of Cuba – Admiral Edward Vernon arrives at Guantánamo Bay in Cuba.
 4/5 August–9 December – Vernon captures Guantánamo Bay and renames it Cumberland Bay. His troops hold it but are resisted by local guerrilla forces and withdraw.
 22 August–14 September – George Frideric Handel composes the oratorio Messiah in London to a libretto compiled by Charles Jennens, completing the "Hallelujah Chorus" on 6 September. It receives a private rehearsal in Chester in November while Handel is en route to Dublin.
 12 October – George II, as Elector of Hanover, signs the Neustadt Protocol with France, but fails to inform his British government until after his return from Germany. 
 19 October – Actor David Garrick makes his London stage debut, in the title role of Shakespeare's Richard III, having made his professional debut at Ipswich in Oroonoko earlier in the year.
 11 December: 11 a.m. – A "fire-ball" and explosion, perhaps resulting from a meteor, is heard over southern England.
 Henry Hoare begins to lay out the landscape gardens at Stourhead, Wiltshire.

Publications
 April – Henry Fielding's anonymous An Apology for the Life of Mrs. Shamela Andrews satirising Samuel Richardson's novel Pamela.
 Isaac Watts' The Improvement of the Mind.

Births
 6 January – Sarah Trimmer, née Kirby, writer for children (died 1810)
 27 January – Hester Thrale, née Salusbury, diarist (died 1821)
 17 March – William Withering, physician (died 1799)
 c. April/May? – Henry Cort, ironmaster (died 1800)
 11 September – Arthur Young, agriculturist and writer on social and political matters (died 1820)

Deaths
 21 February – Jethro Tull, agriculturist (born 1674)
 10 April – Celia Fiennes, travel writer (born 1662)
 24 May – Lord Augustus FitzRoy, Royal Navy officer (born 1716)
 August – David Owen, Welsh harpist (born 1712)
 31 December – Andrew Archer, politician (born 1659)

References

 
Years in Great Britain